William McKinnon Stanton (April 21, 1924 – May 9, 2010) was a Canadian football player who played for the Ottawa Rough Riders. He won the Grey Cup with them in 1951. He previously played football for and attended North Carolina State University, and in 1949 for the Buffalo Bills of the All-America Football Conference. He died in 2010.

References

1924 births
Ottawa Rough Riders players
People from Dillon, South Carolina
2010 deaths
North Carolina State University alumni
Buffalo Bills players